Earl Douthitt (September 8, 1952 – October 29, 2013) was an American football defensive back. He played for the Chicago Bears in 1975.

He died after being hit by a car on October 29, 2013, in Cleveland, Ohio at age 61.

References

1952 births
2013 deaths
American football defensive backs
Iowa Hawkeyes football players
Chicago Bears players
Road incident deaths in Ohio